Armando Miguel Correia de Sá (born 16 September 1975) is a Mozambican football manager and former player who serves as assistant coach of Canadian club Pacific FC. As a player, he played mainly as a right back.

He also held a Portuguese passport, and played professionally in four countries in a 16-year professional career: Portugal (six teams, including a two-and-a-half-year spell with Benfica), Spain, England (five months with Leeds United) and Iran.

Club career
Sá was born in Maputo. After playing for most of his early career with modest Portuguese clubs he joined Rio Ave F.C. for the 1998–99 season, and his performances there attracted attention from S.C. Braga.

In December 2001, after having played with the Minho side for only four months he, alongside teammates Ricardo Rocha and Tiago, left for the Primeira Liga with S.L. Benfica. Though not an undisputed starter at the latter team, he still managed to appear in a good number of games.

Sá subsequently moved to La Liga with Villarreal CF in 2004–05, helping to a third-place finish after which he signed with fellow Spaniards RCD Espanyol. He finished 2006–07 on loan at Football League Championship's Leeds United, which eventually ranked last. He made his debut for the Yorkshire-based team as a substitute in a 1–3 away loss against West Bromwich Albion for the campaign's FA Cup, and ended up playing in several positions: right back, left back and also in midfield.

In July 2007, Sá signed for Foolad FC, who competed in Iran's second level and were led by Portuguese coach Augusto Inácio, his father-in-law. After achieving promotion in his first season he switched to another club in the country, Sepahan FC.

International career
Sá was capped six times for the Mozambique national team.

Managerial career
As of 2022, Sá holds UEFA A and Canada Soccer A coaching licenses. In 2019, he became the owner and technical director of PRO11 Soccer Academy in Ontario.

On 10 March 2022, Sá signed with Canadian Premier League side Pacific FC as an assistant coach.

Honours
Benfica
Taça de Portugal: 2003–04

Villarreal
UEFA Intertoto Cup: 2004

Espanyol
Copa del Rey: 2005–06

Sepahan
Iran Pro League: 2009–10

References

External links

 
 
 

1975 births
Living people
Sportspeople from Maputo
Mozambican footballers
Association football defenders
Primeira Liga players
Liga Portugal 2 players
Segunda Divisão players
U.D. Vilafranquense players
GD Bragança players
Rio Ave F.C. players
S.C. Braga players
S.L. Benfica footballers
La Liga players
Villarreal CF players
RCD Espanyol footballers
English Football League players
Leeds United F.C. players
Persian Gulf Pro League players
Foolad FC players
Sepahan S.C. footballers
Mozambique international footballers
Mozambican expatriate footballers
Expatriate footballers in Portugal
Expatriate footballers in Spain
Expatriate footballers in England
Expatriate footballers in Iran
Mozambican expatriate sportspeople in Portugal
Mozambican expatriate sportspeople in Spain
Mozambican expatriate sportspeople in Iran
Mozambican football managers
Expatriate soccer managers in Canada
Pacific FC non-playing staff